John Rowson Smith (1810 – 1864) was a panorama painter in the United States. His father was John Rubens Smith. Several publications about him and his work were published. He produced a successful three reel rendition of the Mississippi River. It was also published in book form.

He was born in Boston and grew up in Brooklyn before moving to Philadelphia.

Smith was a pioneer in the creation of moving panoramas. He was a rival of John Banvard.

Artist Russell Smith considered him a great scamp and reportedly gave his own son a distinctive name so there would be no confusion between the two.

He died on March 21, 1864 in Philadelphia and was interred at Laurel Hill Cemetery.

See also
Richard Risley Carlisle

References

1810 births
1864 deaths
19th-century American painters
19th-century American male artists
American male painters
Artists from Boston
Artists from Brooklyn
Artists from Philadelphia
Burials at Laurel Hill Cemetery (Philadelphia)
Painters from Massachusetts
Painters from New York City
Painters from Pennsylvania